Alonzo Jay Edgerton (June 7, 1827 – August 9, 1896) was a United States senator from Minnesota and a United States district judge of the United States District Court for the District of South Dakota.

Education and career

Born June 7, 1827, in Rome, Oneida County, New York, Edgerton graduated from Wesleyan University in 1850 and read law in 1855. At Wesleyan, he became a member of the Mystical Seven. He was admitted to the bar and entered private practice in Mantorville, Minnesota, from 1855 to 1861. He was prosecutor for Dodge County, Minnesota. He was a member of the Minnesota Senate from 1858 to 1859. In 1862, during the American Civil War, Edgerton organized a company of militia which later constituted Company B of the Tenth Minnesota Infantry Volunteers. By January 1864, he had risen to the rank of Colonel of the 67th Regiment Infantry United States Colored Troops. He was brevetted a brigadier general on March 13, 1865, and confirmed on April 10, 1866. He resumed private practice in Mantorville from 1867 to 1871. He was Railroad Commissioner for Minnesota from 1871 to 1874. Edgerton became a regent of the University of Minnesota in 1872. He again resumed private practice in Mantorville from 1874 to 1877. He served as a member of the Minnesota House of Representatives and returned to private practice in Mantorville from 1878 to 1881.

Congressional service

Edgerton was appointed as a Republican to the United States Senate to fill the vacancy caused by the resignation of United States Senator William Windom and served from March 12, 1881, to October 30, 1881, during the 47th United States Congress, when a successor was elected.

Later career

Following his departure from Congress, Edgerton served as a Judge of the District Court for the District of Dakota Territory from 1881 to 1885. He returned to private practice in Mitchell, Dakota Territory (State of South Dakota from November 2, 1889) from 1885 to 1889. He served as President of the constitutional convention of South Dakota.

Federal judicial service

Edgerton received a recess appointment from President Benjamin Harrison on November 19, 1889, to the United States District Court for the District of South Dakota, to a new seat authorized by 25 Stat. 676. He was nominated to the same position by President Harrison on December 16, 1889. He was confirmed by the United States Senate on January 16, 1890, and received his commission the same day. His service terminated on August 9, 1896, due to his death in Sioux Falls, South Dakota. He was interred in Evergreen Cemetery in Mantorville.

Membership

Edgerton was a freemason.

Honor

The town of Edgerton, Minnesota, is named in Edgerton's honor.

See also

 List of American Civil War generals (Union)
 List of American Civil War brevet Generals (Union)

References

Sources
 

1827 births
1896 deaths
Politicians from Rome, New York
People of Minnesota in the American Civil War
Wesleyan University alumni
Union Army colonels
Republican Party Minnesota state senators
Politicians from Sioux Falls, South Dakota
Judges of the United States District Court for the District of South Dakota
United States federal judges appointed by Benjamin Harrison
19th-century American judges
Justices of the Dakota Territorial Supreme Court
Republican Party United States senators from Minnesota
South Dakota Republicans
United States federal judges admitted to the practice of law by reading law
People from Mantorville, Minnesota
19th-century American politicians